The Malayan night heron (Gorsachius melanolophus), also known as Malaysian night heron and tiger bittern, is a medium-sized heron. It is distributed in southern and eastern Asia.

Distribution and habitat 
The Malayan night heron has been found in India, Sri Lanka, Brunei, Nepal, Bangladesh, Myanmar, Cambodia, Laos, Vietnam, Thailand, Malaysia, Singapore, China, Indonesia, the Philippines, Taiwan and Japan. It is a vagrant in Christmas Island and Palau. Its range size is estimated at 1,240,000 km2. This bird occurs in forests, streams, and marshes.

Description 
It is stocky, with a short beak. Its neck and breast are rufous. There are streaks going down the centre of the neck to the breast. The upperparts are chestnut and vermiculated. The flight feathers are blackish. The crown is black, the chin is white, and the eyes are yellow. The beak is black and the legs are greenish. The juvenile is greyish to rufous and is spotted and vermiculated.

Biology 
The Malayan night heron is usually solitary. It roosts in trees and feeds in open areas. Its territorial call is deep oo notes. It also produces hoarse croaks and arh, arh, arh. The most common food items are earthworms and frogs, and it will sometimes eat fish. A study of its pellets found reptiles, snails, chilopods, arachnids, crabs and  insects.

Conservation 
The bird has a large range and its global population is between 2,000 and 20,000 individuals. Its population trend is not known, but it does not meet the criteria for a vulnerable species status.

References

External links 
BirdLife Species Factsheet

Malayan night heron
Birds of Northeast India
Birds of South India
Birds of Southeast Asia
Malayan night heron
Birds of Nepal